USCGC Mohawk (WMEC-913) is a 270' United States Coast Guard Famous-class medium endurance cutter. She was launched on September 9, 1989 at Robert Derecktor Shipyard Incorporated of Middletown, Rhode Island and commissioned in March 1991. She is the third cutter named for the Mohawk nation, a tribe of Iroquoian Indians from the Mohawk Valley of New York.

Service history
Mohawk is the thirteenth and last of the 270 foot Famous class cutters.  Built by the former Robert E. Derecktor Shipyards of Rhode Island, Mohawk was christened on September 9, 1989.  Since the time of her commissioning in March 1991, she served the Coast Guard in a wide variety of missions including Search and Rescue, Maritime Law Enforcement, and Alien Migrant Interdiction Operations.

Mohawk has been responsible for the rescue of more than 5,000 Haitian, Cuban, and Dominican Republic migrants and has supported as many as 756 migrants on deck at one time.  Mohawk has also seized more than 20,700 pounds of illegal drugs.  This, as well as Mohawks role in several search and rescue cases and numerous boardings to enforce the United States national laws, has earned Mohawk two Unit Commendations, the Joint Meritorious Service Award and two Humanitarian Service Awards. Mohawk is homeported in Key West, Florida.
On 13 January 2010, the Mohawk was ordered to assist in the humanitarian relief efforts following the 2010 Haiti earthquake.

In 2016, Mohawk completed a major MEP overhaul that was supposed to take 3 months but took almost two years in Baltimore, MD.

In June 2022, Mohawk escorted the fast response cutters USCGC John Scheuerman (WPC-1146) and USCGC Clarence Sutphin Jr. (WPC-1147) across the Atlantic Ocean on the way to their home port of Manama, Bahrain. She provided at-sea refueling services for the smaller, shorter-range vessels.

Resources 
An HDTV documentary called A Day in the Life of the Mohawk- shows the Famous-class cutter patrolling the United States south coastal region in February and March 1999.

References

External links

United States Coast Guard Atlantic Area Cutters - CGC Mohawk

Ships of the United States Coast Guard
Famous-class cutters
Ships built in Middletown, Rhode Island
1989 ships
2010 Haiti earthquake relief